Black Devil may refer to:

Military
 The Black Devils or First Special Service Force, a military unit during World War II
 370th Infantry Regiment (United States) or Black Devils, an African-American regiment in World War I
 Erich Hartmann or the Black Devil, a German World War II fighter pilot

Other uses
 Black Devil (cigarette), a Dutch brand
 The Black Devil (film), a 1957 Italian adventure film
 Black Devil Disco Club, an electronic disco music project

See also
 Royal Winnipeg Rifles or the Little Black Devils